Area code 502 serves north central Kentucky, primarily  Louisville, its suburbs, and the state capital, Frankfort. Its service area encompasses the following Kentucky counties (the boundary closely, but not exactly, tracks county lines):

Anderson County
Bullitt County
Carroll County
Franklin County
Henry County
Jefferson County
Nelson County
Oldham County
Owen County
Scott County
Shelby County
Spencer County
Trimble County

Parts of Hardin and Meade counties are also served by this area code, specifically:
The Fort Knox Army installation, located primarily in Hardin County, also spreads into Meade, and Bullitt counties.
The city of Muldraugh, which straddles the Meade–Hardin County line and is surrounded by Fort Knox.
The city of West Point in Hardin County and its surrounding area, which is separated from the rest of Hardin County by Fort Knox.

Besides Louisville and Frankfort, other cities within the 502 area code boundary include Georgetown, Shelbyville, and Bardstown. Georgetown is a long-distance call to other cities in the 502 area code, but is a free local call to Lexington, which is in the 859 area code.

The area code was one of the first established in October 1947, initially covering the entire state of Kentucky.  The eastern half of the state split off as area code 606 in 1954, while the western half split off as 270 in 1999.

See also

References

External links
Map of the 502 Area Code
 List of exchanges from AreaCodeDownload.com, 502 Area Code

502
502
Telecommunications-related introductions in 1947
1947 establishments in Kentucky